Peter Sobotta (born January 11, 1987) is a retired Polish-born German professional mixed martial artist, who fought in the Welterweight division of the Ultimate Fighting Championship (UFC). A professional competitor since 2004, Sobotta has also formerly competed for KSW.

Background
Sobotta was born in Zabrze, Poland, on January 11, 1987, and grew up in the small German town of Balingen. His childhood hero was Jackie Chan, who inspired him to take up martial arts, beginning with judo and then Kung Fu and Tae Kwon Do. He then took up Muay Thai and Brazilian jiu-jitsu when an MMA school opened near his home town.

Mixed martial arts career

Early career
Sobotta had his first professional mixed martial arts fight at the age of 17, and he compiled a record of 8–1, competing for several regional promotions across Europe before being signed by the UFC in 2009.

Ultimate Fighting Championship
Sobotta made his promotional debut on June 13, 2009, at UFC 99 against Paul Taylor. After three rounds, Sobotta lost the fight via unanimous decision.

Sobotta was scheduled to have his second UFC fight against DaMarques Johnson on November 14, 2009, at UFC 105, but due to a military commitment for Sobotta, the bout was canceled.

Instead, Sobotta fought James Wilks on June 12, 2010, at UFC 115, losing by unanimous decision (30–27, 30–28, 30–27).

Sobotta then faced The Ultimate Fighter 7 winner, Amir Sadollah on November 13, 2010, at UFC 122.  He lost the fight via unanimous decision and was promptly released from the promotion along with Goran Reljic and Seth Petruzelli.

After three years on the independent circuit, going 5-0-1 in the process, Sobotta was re-signed by the UFC.

Sobotta faced promotional newcomer Pawel Pawlak at UFC Fight Night 41 on May 31, 2014. Sobatta defeated Pawlak by unanimous decision to earn his first UFC victory.

Sobotta was expected to face Sérgio Moraes on April 11, 2015, at UFC Fight Night 64.  However, Sobotta was forced out of the bout, citing an injury, and he was replaced by Gasan Umalatov.

The fight with Moraes was rescheduled for June 20, 2015 at UFC Fight Night 69. On June 9, the fight was scrapped once again as Moraes pulled out for undisclosed reasons. He was replaced by promotional newcomer Steve Kennedy. Sobotta won the fight via submission in the first round.

Sobotta faced Kyle Noke on November 15, 2015, at UFC 193. He lost the fight via TKO in the first round, after being dropped with a body kick, followed by punches on the ground.

Sobotta was expected to face Dominic Waters on May 8, 2016, at UFC Fight Night 87. However, Sobotta pulled out of the fight in late March, citing an injury, and he was replaced by Leon Edwards.

Sobotta next faced Nicolas Dalby on September 3, 2016, at UFC Fight Night 93. Before the bout, Sobotta announced he would henceforth represent Jamaica in the UFC, rather than continue to choose between Poland and Germany and offend the other. Sobotta won the fight by unanimous decision.

Sobotta faced Ben Saunders on May 28, 2017, at UFC Fight Night 109. He won the fight via TKO in the second round.

Sobotta faced Leon Edwards on March 17, 2018, at UFC Fight Night 127. He lost the fight via TKO in the third round.

Sobotta was scheduled to face Alessio Di Chirico in a middleweight bout on September 28, 2019, at UFC on ESPN+ 18.  However, Sobotta was forced out of the bout due to an undisclosed injury, and he was replaced by promotional newcomer Makhmud Muradov.

Sobotta faced Alex Oliveira on July 26, 2020, at UFC on ESPN 14. He lost the fight via unanimous decision. Following the last fight of his contract, Sobotta announced his retirement.

Personal life
Sobotta was born in Poland, but raised in Germany. He chose to wear the Jamaican flag at his weigh-in for UFC Fight Night 109, despite the fact that he has  dual citizenship to both Poland and Germany. He explained on the  UFC Fight Night 109 post fight press conference that the reason he chose to wear the Jamaica flag was to send the "One Love" message to the world.

On December 9, 2017, Sobotta married his wife Lisa Sobotta and they have two children.

Mixed martial arts record

|-
|Loss
|align=center|17–7–1
|Alex Oliveira
|Decision (unanimous)
|UFC on ESPN: Whittaker vs. Till 
|
|align=center|3
|align=center|5:00
|Abu Dhabi, United Arab Emirates
|
|-
|Loss
|align=center|17–6–1
|Leon Edwards
|TKO (punches)
|UFC Fight Night: Werdum vs. Volkov 
|
|align=center|3
|align=center|4:59
|London, England
|
|-
|Win
|align=center|17–5–1
|Ben Saunders
|TKO (punches and knee)
|UFC Fight Night: Gustafsson vs. Teixeira
|
|align=center|2
|align=center|2:29
|Stockholm, Sweden
| 
|-
| Win
| align=center| 16–5–1
| Nicolas Dalby
| Decision (unanimous)
| UFC Fight Night: Arlovski vs. Barnett
| 
| align=center| 3
| align=center| 5:00
| Hamburg, Germany
|  
|-
|Loss
| align=center| 15–5–1
| Kyle Noke
|  TKO (body kick and punches)
| UFC 193
| 
| align=center| 1
| align=center| 2:01
| Melbourne, Australia
| 
|-
| Win
| align=center | 15–4–1
| Steve Kennedy
| Submission (rear-naked choke)
| UFC Fight Night: Jędrzejczyk vs. Penne
| 
| align=center| 1
| align=center| 2:57
| Berlin, Germany
|
|- 
| Win
| align=center| 14–4–1
| Pawel Pawlak
| Decision (unanimous)
| UFC Fight Night: Munoz vs. Mousasi
| 
| align=center| 3
| align=center| 5:00
| Berlin, Germany
| 
|-
| Win
| align=center| 13–4–1
| Tamirlan Dadaev
| Submission (rear-naked choke)
| R2F: Casino Fight Night 3
| 
| align=center| 1
| align=center| 2:10
| Erfurt, Germany
| 
|-
| Win
| align=center| 12–4–1
| Mustafa Asmaoui
| Submission (rear-naked choke)
| R2F: Casino Fight Night 3
| 
| align=center| 1
| align=center| 3:36
| Erfurt, Germany
| 
|-
| Win
| align=center| 11–4–1
| Branimir Radosavljevic
| Submission (rear-naked choke)
| R2F: Casino Fight Night 3
| 
| align=center| 1
| align=center| 0:35
| Erfurt, Germany
| 
|-
| Win
| align=center| 
| Juan Manuel Suárez
| Submission (rear-naked choke)
| MMA Attack 2
| 
| align=center| 1
| align=center| 2:18
| Katowice, Poland
| 
|-
| Win
| align=center| 9–4–1
| Marius Panin
| Submission (rear-naked choke)
| Eurogames MMA Sports 
| 
| align=center| 1
| align=center| 1:20
| Iași, Romania
| 
|-
| Draw
| align=center| 8–4–1
| Borys Mańkowski
| Draw (overturned)
| MMA Attack
| 
| align=center| 3
| align=center| 3:00
| Warsaw, Poland
| 
|-
| Loss
| align=center| 8–4
| Amir Sadollah
| Decision (unanimous)
| UFC 122
| 
| align=center| 3
| align=center| 5:00
| Oberhausen, Germany
| 
|-
| Loss
| align=center| 8–3
| James Wilks
| Decision (unanimous)
| UFC 115
| 
| align=center| 3
| align=center| 5:00
| Vancouver, British Columbia, Canada
| 
|-
| Loss
| align=center| 8–2
| Paul Taylor
| Decision (unanimous)
| UFC 99
| 
| align=center| 3
| align=center| 5:00
| Cologne, Germany
| 
|-
| Win
| align=center| 8–1
| Kerim Abzailow
| TKO (punches)
| KSW Extra
| 
| align=center| 3
| align=center| 1:12
| Dąbrowa Górnicza, Poland
| 
|-
| Win
| align=center| 7–1
| Dominique Stetefeld
| Submission (triangle choke)
| Free Fight Association
| 
| align=center| 1
| align=center| 4:38
| Erfurt, Germany
| 
|-
| Win
| align=center| 6–1
| Simon Fiess
| TKO (punches)
| Free Fight Association
| 
| align=center| 1
| align=center| 0:38
| Erfurt, Germany
| 
|-
| Win
| align=center| 5–1
| Robin Dutry
| Submission (armbar)
| Outsider Cup 9
| 
| align=center| 1
| align=center| 1:11
| Bielefeld, Germany
| 
|-
| Loss
| align=center| 4–1
| Nelson Siegert
| Submission (punches)
| FFC: Battle for the Belt
| 
| align=center| 2
| align=center| 4:55
| Leipzig, Germany
| 
|-
| Win
| align=center| 4–0
| Hendrik Nitzsche
| TKO (punches)
| FFC: Battle for the Belt
| 
| align=center| 1
| align=center| 3:15
| Leipzig, Germany
| 
|-
| Win
| align=center| 3–0
| Peter Micuch
| TKO (punches)
| FFC: Heaven or Hell
| 
| align=center| 1
| align=center| 3:15
| Leipzig, Germany
| 
|-
| Win
| align=center| 2–0
| Peter Salzgeber
| Submission (rear-naked choke)
| UCS: Fighting Day 2
| 
| align=center| 1
| align=center| 0:33
| Geislingen, Germany
| 
|-
| Win
| align=center| 1–0
| Christian Bruckner
| Submission (armbar)
| Free Fight Championship
| 
| align=center| 1
| align=center| 1:00
| Leipzig, Germany
|

See also
 List of current UFC fighters
 List of male mixed martial artists

References

External links

 Peter's home page

1987 births
Living people
Polish male mixed martial artists
German male mixed martial artists
Welterweight mixed martial artists
Mixed martial artists utilizing wushu
Mixed martial artists utilizing taekwondo
Mixed martial artists utilizing Muay Thai
Mixed martial artists utilizing judo
Mixed martial artists utilizing Brazilian jiu-jitsu
Polish practitioners of Brazilian jiu-jitsu
German practitioners of Brazilian jiu-jitsu
People awarded a black belt in Brazilian jiu-jitsu
Polish male judoka
German male judoka
Polish wushu practitioners
German wushu practitioners
Polish Muay Thai practitioners
German Muay Thai practitioners
Polish male taekwondo practitioners
German male taekwondo practitioners
Sportspeople from Tübingen (region)
Polish emigrants to Germany
Sportspeople from Zabrze
Ultimate Fighting Championship male fighters
People from Balingen